The 2022–23 Colorado College Tigers men's ice hockey season will be the 83rd season of play for the program and the 10th in the NCHC conference. The Tigers represent Colorado College and will be coached by Kris Mayotte, in his 2nd season.

Season

Departures

Recruiting

Roster
As of August 1, 2022.

Standings

Schedule and results

|-
!colspan=12 style=";" | Exhibition

|-
!colspan=12 style=";" | Regular Season

|-
!colspan=12 style=";" |

Scoring Statistics

Goaltending statistics

Rankings

References

2022-23
Colorado College Tigers
Colorado College Tigers
Colorado College Tigers
Colorado College Tigers